The 2016 AFC U-16 Championship squads are squads which participated in the 2016 AFC U-16 Championship.

Group A

India
Head coach: Nicolai Adam

Iran
Head coach: Abbas Chamanyan

Saudi Arabia
Head coach:

United Arab Emirates
Head coach:

Group B

Australia
Head coach:Tony Vidmar

Japan
Head Coach:  Yoshiro Moriyama

Vietnam
Head coach: Đinh Thế Nam

Kyrgyzstan
Head coach:

Group C

South Korea

Head coach: Seo Hyo-won

Malaysia
Head coach:

Oman

Head coach:

Iraq
Head coach: Qahtan Chathir

Group D

North Korea
Head coach:

Uzbekistan
Head coach:

Thailand
Head coach: Chaiyong Khumpiam

Yemen
Head coach:Amin AL-Sunaini

References

, the-AFC.com

External links

Squads
AFC U-16 Championship squads